Amoha (Sanskrit, Pali; Tibetan Wylie: gti mug med pa) is a Buddhist term translated as "non-delusion"  or "non-bewilderment". It is defined as being without delusion concerning what is true, due to discrimination; its function is to cause one to not engage in unwholesome actions.  It is one of the mental factors within the Abhidharma teachings. 

The Abhidharma-samuccaya states: 

What is non-deludedness? It is a thorough comprehension of (practical) knowledge that comes from maturation, instructions, thinking and understanding, and its function is to provide a basis for not becoming involved in evil behavior.

Herbert Guenther states:
 It is a distinct discriminatory awareness to counteract the deludedness that has its cause in either what one has been born into or what one has acquired.

See also
 Alobha (Non-greed)
 Adosa (Non-hatred)
 Buddhist paths to liberation
 Mental factors (Buddhism)

Notes

References
 Guenther, Herbert V. &  Leslie S. Kawamura (1975), Mind in Buddhist Psychology: A Translation of Ye-shes rgyal-mtshan's "The Necklace of Clear Understanding". Dharma Publishing. Kindle Edition.
 Kunsang, Erik Pema (translator) (2004). Gateway to Knowledge, Vol. 1. North Atlantic Books.

External links
 Ranjung Yeshe wiki entry for gti_mug_med_pa
 Berzin Archives glossary entry for "amoha"

Wholesome factors in Buddhism
Sanskrit words and phrases